Mathiasen is a Danish-Norwegian patronymic surname meaning "son of Mathias" (equivalent of the Biblical Μαθθαιος, cf. English Matthew). Several spelling variants are used, including Matthiasen and Matthiassen. A similar diversity of forms exist for the parallel given name Mathies/Mathis.  Though not a hard and fast rule, generally spellings with a single s are Danish and a double ss are Norwegian.
There are several people with the surname Mathiasen:

Jakob Mathiasen, Danish athlete
Dwight Mathiasen (born 1963), Canadian ice hockey player 
Dennis Mathiasen (born 1981), Danish handball players

Matthiasen may refer to:
 Niels Matthiasen, Danish politician

Mathiassen may refer to:
 Therkel Mathiassen (1892-1967), Danish archaeologist

See also  
Matthiessen
Mathiesen

Danish-language surnames
Norwegian-language surnames
Patronymic surnames
Surnames from given names